In enzymology, a hydroxyanthraquinone glucosyltransferase is an enzyme that catalyzes the chemical reaction

UDP-glucose + an hydroxyanthraquinone  UDP + a glucosyloxyanthraquinone

Thus, the two substrates of this enzyme are UDP-glucose and hydroxyanthraquinone, whereas its two products are UDP and glucosyloxyanthraquinone.

This enzyme belongs to the family of glycosyltransferases, specifically the hexosyltransferases.  The systematic name of this enzyme class is UDP-glucose:hydroxyanthraquinone O-glucosyltransferase. Other names in common use include uridine diphosphoglucose-anthraquinone glucosyltransferase, and anthraquinone-specific glucosyltransferase.

References

 

EC 2.4.1
Enzymes of unknown structure